The Macau records in swimming are the fastest ever performances of swimmers from Macao, which are recognised and ratified by the Associação de Natação de Macau.

All records were set in finals unless noted otherwise.

Long Course (50 m)

Men

Women

Mixed relay

Short Course (25 m)

Men

Women

Mixed relay

References
General
Macanese Records 9 January 2023 updated
Specific

External links
Swimming Association of Macao website

Macau
Records